Echuca railway station is located on the Deniliquin line in Victoria, Australia. It serves the town of Echuca, and opened on 19 September 1864.

It is the northern-most operating passenger railway station on the Deniliquin line, and is the terminus for Echuca line services. It also serves as the terminus of the freight-only Toolamba–Echuca line. The Deniliquin line operates northwards, over the New South Wales state border, for freight traffic. Freight sidings and a silo are located opposite the station.

History
The railway reached Echuca in 1864 and, with the opening of the Echuca Wharf, the town was transformed into a major river port, encouraging substantial urban growth in the 1870s. In 1876, the Deniliquin and Moama Railway Company opened its -long private railway northwards to Deniliquin.

The brick station building at Echuca was provided with the opening of the line, along with a double-gabled brick goods shed, and a three-road locomotive depot. The station building was expanded in 1877, and a large water tower was erected in the same year (demolished in 1977). An iron footbridge was added in 1880. In June 1974, the former northern waiting room section of the station building was demolished. The concrete rail bridge over the Murray River, to the north of the station, opened in February 1989, replacing a combined road and rail bridge that opened in 1878.

A short branch line between Echuca and the port opened with the line, but was closed in 1971. In 2000, $150,000 was provided to fund the reconstruction of the line. By 2002, work was underway, with the cost increased to $330,000. However, by 2007, the branch was out of use and was disconnected from the main line.

The branch line from Echuca to Toolamba closed in 2007, but was reopened in October 2013. Services on the line were suspended in January 2020.

Platforms and services
Echuca has one platform. It is served by terminating Echuca line trains from Southern Cross.

Platform 1:
  services to and from Southern Cross

Transport links
Echuca is also served by V/Line road coach services between Bendigo and Moama, and NSW TrainLink road coach services to Albury and Wagga Wagga.

Gallery

References

External links

Victorian Railway Stations gallery
Melway map at street-directory.com.au

Echuca-Moama
Railway stations in Australia opened in 1864
Regional railway stations in Victoria (Australia)